Takayuki Takaguchi (高口 隆行, born August 23, 1983 in Edogawa, Tokyo) is a Japanese former professional baseball shortstop in Japan's Nippon Professional Baseball. He played for the Hokkaido Nippon-Ham Fighters from 2007 to 2010, the Chiba Lotte Marines in 2011 and for the Yomiuri Giants in 2012 and 2013. He later coached with the Orix Buffaloes in 2020 and 2021.

External links

NBP

1983 births
Living people
People from Edogawa, Tokyo
Japanese baseball players
Nippon Professional Baseball infielders
Hokkaido Nippon-Ham Fighters players
Chiba Lotte Marines players
Yomiuri Giants players
Japanese baseball coaches
Nippon Professional Baseball coaches
Baseball people from Tokyo